Sar Chah or Sar-e Chah or Sar-i-Chah or Sarchah may refer to:
Sar Chah, Chaharmahal and Bakhtiari
Sarchah, Qir and Karzin, Fars Province
Sar Chah-e Duruznab, Khuzestan Province
Sar Chah-e Khoshab, Khuzestan Province
Sar Chah, Razavi Khorasan
Sar Chah-e Ammari, South Khorasan Province
Sar Chah-e Shur, South Khorasan Province
Sar Chah-e Tazian, South Khorasan Province